Michael Tarbox (born January 14, 1956) is an American songwriter, guitarist and singer who performs solo and with the Boston-based group The Tarbox Ramblers.

Career

The Tarbox Ramblers
Michael Tarbox formed The Tarbox Ramblers in 1994. The band's sound originally centered on arrangements of early twentieth-century blues, gospel and Appalachian music. It later included Tarbox's original songs.

The Tarbox Ramblers' albums on the Rounder label include a self-titled debut and a second release titled A Fix Back East. They feature Tarbox, string-bassist Johnny Sciascia and violinist Daniel Kellar, with drummers Jon Cohan, RL Hulsman, Howie Ferguson and Alan Sheinfeld. Most of A Fix Back East was produced in Memphis by Jim Dickinson; several tracks were produced by Sean Slade and Paul Kolderie at Camp Street Studios in Cambridge, Massachusetts. The music on the Tarbox Ramblers albums is characterized by three-part vocal harmonies, a heavy rhythm section and the interplay of slide guitar and violin.

Solo work
Tarbox has worked as a solo artist throughout his career, often favoring a drum-guitar duo format. In 2010 he released his first solo album, My Primitive Joy. Produced by Scott McEwen at The Fry Pharmacy Studio in Old Hickory, TN, its spare arrangements, acoustic sound and lyrical approach stand in contrast to The Tarbox Ramblers' aggressive amplified sound. A second solo album was slated for release in 2012.

Television
Michael Tarbox's songs have been used in the television shows Sons of Anarchy  and Supernatural. They include "Ashes To Ashes," "Already Gone," "Were You There?" and "No Harm Blues."

Equipment
Tarbox plays a Supro Lockola solid-body electric guitar in G Tuning (DGDGBD); an Airline Town and Country solid-body electric in D (DADF#AD); and an Epiphone acoustic or Gibson L-4CES hollow-body electric guitar in Standard Tuning (EADGBE). He uses Fender Deluxe and Supro amps in combination with a Premier reverb tank.

Discography
 Tarbox Ramblers, Rounder Records, 2000
 A Fix Back East, Rounder Records, 2004
 Four From The West  (limited edition live set) 2006
 First Songs/Gospel Cross (limited edition early recordings) 2010—SOLO RECORDINGS
 My Primitive Joy, 2010

External links
 Allmusic.com Review of "Tarbox Ramblers"
 "Tarbox Ramblers", Geoffrey Himes, The Washington Post, April 21, 2000

1956 births
American male singer-songwriters
American singer-songwriters
American rock guitarists
American blues guitarists
American folk guitarists
Living people
20th-century American guitarists
American male guitarists
20th-century American male musicians